was a tozama feudal domain under the Tokugawa shogunate of  Edo period Japan.  It was located in northwestern Ōmi Province, in the Kansai region of central Honshu. The domain was centered at Ōmizo jin'ya, located in what is now the city of Takashima in Shiga Prefecture.

History
Ōmizo Castle was built by Tsuda Nobuzumi, a retainer of Akechi Mitsuhide around 1579. However, after the assassination of Nobunaga in 1582, he was executed as he was married to Akechi Mitsuhide's daughter and his territory was seized by Toyotomi Hideyoshi. Under Hideyoshi, the castle passed through a number of hands with rapidity, including Niwa Nagahide, Kato Mitsuyasu, Ikoma Chikamasa and Kyōgoku Takatsugu. 

Ōmizo Domain was established by the Tokugawa shogunate when Wakebe Mitsunori was transferred from Iga-Ueno Domain and assigned a kokudaka of 20,0000 koku in 1619. The Wakebe were local gentry from Ise Province who had supported Tokugawa Ieyasu at the Battle of Sekigahara. As his status did not allow for a castle, the existing Ōmizo Castle was destroyed, leaving only the outer San-no-maru Bailey, upon which he constructed a jin'ya. He also laid out the surrounding jōkamachi and served the shogunate as a magistrate at Osaka Castle and at Mount Hiei. He was succeeded by his son, Wakebe Yoshiharu who, in 1658, killed his wife's uncle Ikeda Nagashige over a trivial argument, and succumbed to his own wounds the following day. His son, Wakebe Yoshitaka died at the age of 20 without heir. To avoid attainder, the clan turned to Ikeda Nobumasa, daimyō of Bitchu-Matsuyama Domain (who was a relative of Yoshitaka's mother) for an heir. They were sent his third son, who became Wakebe Nobumasa. However, the domain's finances were always in a precarious situation and due to frequent floods and crop failures, especially in 1669 and 1676, the domain often had to apply to the shogunate for assistance or exemption from its sankin kōtai obligation. The domain was often assigned then post of Osaka kaban, which was also a serious drain on its resources. Although the 8th daimyō, Wakebe Mitsuzane, attempted to implement a five-year plan of fiscal reforms, he was ultimately unsuccessful. During the Bakumatsu period, the 11th daimyō, Wakebe Mitsusada was assigned to the guard of Emperor Kōmei in Kyoto. The domain sided with the imperial cause in the Boshin War and he died in 1870, just before he could be appointed imperial governor of Ōmizo. 

The final daimyō, Wakebe Mitsunori died on November 29, 1944, and was one of the last surviving daimyō (along with Hayashi Tadataka of Jōzai Domain and Asano Nagakoto of Hiroshima Domain). Wakebe Mitsunori outlined Hayashi and Asano; however, he succeeded to his title after the formal position of daimyō had been abolished, and his formal title was that of  rather than daimyō. These circumstances lead historians to consider Hayashi Tadataka of the Jōzai Domain to have been last surviving daimyō.

Ōmizo was incorporated into Ōtsu prefecture, which subsequently became part of Shiga Prefecture.

Bakumatsu period holdings
As with most domains in the han system, Ōmizo Domain consisted of a discontinuous territories calculated to provide the assigned kokudaka, based on periodic cadastral surveys and projected agricultural yields.

Ōmi Province
4 villages in Yasu District
33 villages in Takashima District

List of daimyō
  Wakebe clan (Tozama) 1619-1871

See also
List of Han

References
The content of this article was largely derived from that of the corresponding article on Japanese Wikipedia.

See also

Notes

Domains of Japan
1619 establishments in Japan
History of Shiga Prefecture
Ōmi Province